The diocese of Mibiarca (in Latin: Dioecesis Mibiarcensis) is a suppressed and titular see of the Roman Catholic Church, in today's Tunisia. It is an ancient episcopal seat of the province of Byzacena.

The only known bishop of this African diocese was John, who participated in the anti-monotheistic council of Carthage (641). Today Mibiarca survives as a titular bishopric and its bishop-owner until his death was Luis Morgan Casey, an apostolic vicar emeritus of Pando.
The current titular bishop is Mar Thomas Padiyath, the auxiliary bishop of the Syro-Malabar Eparchy of Shamshabad

References

Catholic titular sees in Africa
Former Roman Catholic dioceses in Africa
Roman towns and cities in Tunisia
Archaeological sites in Tunisia
Ancient Berber cities
Ancient cities